The American Elm cultivar Ulmus americana 'Princeton' was originally selected in 1922 by New Jersey nurseryman William Flemer of Princeton Nurseries for its aesthetic merit. 'Princeton' was later found to have a moderate resistance to Dutch elm disease (DED).

Description
The tree can grow to greater than 30 m in height, and is distinguished by its dense, symmetrical, upright form and dark green foliage, ultimately forming a broad umbrella crown. Crotch angles can be acute, with considerable bark inclusion which can later lead to branch breakages. The leaves are less than 16 cm long by 8 cm broad. 'Princeton' grows quickly, young trees increasing in height by over 1.6 m per annum (d.b.h. by 2.8 cm p.a.) in an assessment at U C Davis as part of the National Elm Trial. The tree commences flowering aged nine years.

Pests and diseases
Testing in laboratory conditions by the United States Department of Agriculture (USDA) from 1992 to 1993 revealed that 'Princeton' had some resistance to Dutch elm disease (DED), although the original Princeton elm, which grew in Princeton Cemetery and was estimated to be over 150 years old, was felled in April 2005 after suffering 60 percent dieback, attributed by some accounts to Dutch Elm Disease. A 2016 publication later reported that, of 100 Princeton elms planted from 2001 to 2007 within a three state area in the United States, nine came down with DED, seven died, and two were saved by assiduous pruning. 

Moreover, trees introduced to the United Kingdom, where the larger bark beetle Scolytus scolytus is the principal vector, were found to be susceptible, and many died, as did all 20 sent to Eisele, Darmstadt, for testing by inoculation with the pathogen. Princeton elms planted in North America are highly prone to leaf damage by Japanese beetles Popillia japonica. Trees grown in the UK have also proven very susceptible to damage by leaf-feeding insects, far more so than native or Asiatic elms. Henry noted that such damage was common to all American Elm Ulmus americana grown in the UK. Trees grown in northern California at UC Davis became infested with leaf curling aphids (Eriosoma), producing copious amounts of honeydew.

Cultivation

Examples of 'Princeton' were planted along Washington Road and another road in Princeton; most of these trees survive to this day unaffected by disease. In 2005, approximately 90 Princeton elms were planted along Pennsylvania Avenue in front of  the White House in Washington, D.C. 'Princeton' is currently being evaluated in the United States as part of the National Elm Trial coordinated by Colorado State University.

The tree was introduced to the UK by Penelope Hobhouse, who obtained two specimens from the New York Botanical Gardens for planting at her family home, Hadspen, in Somerset. The tree was later marketed by the Knoll Gardens nursery in Dorset. In 2005, 50 'Princeton' were planted by The Prince of Wales to create the Anniversary Avenue at his residence Highgrove House, however all the trees were removed and burnt in 2012 after five died of DED. In Ireland, 100 were planted in Phoenix Park, Dublin, in 2009 to replace some of the 2000 native elms lost to Dutch elm disease since the 1980s. In Scotland, some six have been planted in Edinburgh parks (Gayfield Square Park, The Meadows, Leith Links).

Accessions

North America
Arnold Arboretum, US. Acc. nos. 352-91, 561-89.
Bartlett Tree Experts, US. Acc. nos. 2001-249, 2001-250, 2001-251, 2001-484, 2001-485, 2003-964.
Brentwood, Pennsylvania Arboretum, US. 11 specimens planted as street trees along educational campus, no acc. details available.
Dawes Arboretum, Newark, Ohio, US. 2 trees, no acc. details available.
Holden Arboretum, US. Acc. nos. 2002-435, 2003-174, 56-908.
Longwood Gardens, US. Acc. nos. 2000-0362, 2002-0414, 2003-0032, 2004-0675.
Morton Arboretum, US. Acc. no. 125-2008.
U S National Arboretum , Washington, D.C., US. Acc. no. 57842

Europe
Brighton & Hove City Council, UK. NCCPG Elm Collection.
Grange Farm Arboretum, Sutton St. James, Spalding, Lincs. UK. Acc. no. 697.
Royal Horticultural Society Gardens, Wisley, UK. Planted bed WA 0201, c.2002.
Royal Botanic Gardens, Kew, UK. Acc. no. not known.
Wijdemeren City Council, Netherlands, Elm collection. Five trees Planted Overmeerseweg, Nederhorst den Berg 2015.

Nurseries

North America
Carlton Plants, LLC, Dayton, Oregon, US.
Charles Fiore Nurseries, Prairie View, Illinois, US.
Johnson Farms, Deerfield, New Jersey, US.
Riveredge Farms, Atlanta, Georgia, US.
Sharp Top Trees, White, Georgia, US.
The Botany Shop Garden Center, Joplin, Missouri, US.

References

External links
Photograph from 2002 of Princeton elms lining Washington Road in Princeton, New Jersey

American elm cultivar
Ulmus articles with images
Ulmus